Florian Hempel (born 10 April 1990) is a professional German darts player who plays in Professional Darts Corporation events, and a former handball player.

Achieving little success, Hempel quit the sport and began playing darts. He made his PDC European Tour debut in the 2019 Dutch Darts Masters, and gained his tour card in 2021.

Early life and career
Handball-Bundesliga season. This proved to be his only appearance in the division, and made a further two appearances in the third tier.

Darts
Hempel began playing darts in his flat in 2017, and in 2018 quit his job, registered for unemployment benefits, and took on darts as a full-time job. On his PDC European Tour debut in the Dutch Darts Masters in May 2019, he defeated Ryan Harrington 6–0. Having previously attempting to achieve his Tour Card in both 2018 and 2020, Hempel won his PDC Tour Card during the 2021 European Q-School event. In March, he withdrew from the UK Open due to family reasons. In April, he completed his first nine-dart finish during a European Super League whitewash victory over Marco Obst.

Hempel made his PDC televised début in October in the European Championship, eliminating reigning champion Peter Wright 6–3. The following week, he reached his first semi-final on the PDC Pro Tour before losing 7–3 to Michael Smith. Ahead of his PDC World Darts Championship début, Hempel featured as a guest commentator on Sport1 for the 2021 Grand Slam of Darts. During the 2022 PDC World Darts Championship, Hempel caused a "major upset" when he defeated fifth seed Dimitri Van den Bergh in the second round, averaging 98.37, and described it as "madness". He would go on to lose 4–1 to Australia's Raymond Smith in the third round.

World Championship results

PDC
 2022: Third round (lost to Raymond Smith 1–4)
 2023: Second round (lost to Luke Humphries 2–3)

Performance timeline

PDC European Tour

(W) Won; (F) finalist; (SF) semifinalist; (QF) quarterfinalist; (#R) rounds 6, 5, 4, 3, 2, 1; (RR) round-robin stage; (Prel.) Preliminary round; (DNQ) Did not qualify; (DNP) Did not participate; (NH) Not held; (EX) Excluded; (WD) Withdrew

References

External links

1990 births
Living people
German male handball players
German darts players
Professional Darts Corporation current tour card holders
People from Dessau-Roßlau
Sportspeople from Saxony-Anhalt